The Seven Devils Group is a geologic group in Idaho. It preserves fossils dating back to the Triassic period.

See also

 List of fossiliferous stratigraphic units in Idaho
 Paleontology in Idaho

References
 

Triassic System of North America
Geologic groups of Idaho